Diadegma capense is a wasp first described by P. Cameron in 1906.
No subspecies are listed.

References

capense
Insects described in 1906